McElligott is a surname. Notable people with the surname include:

Bernard McElligott, Irish hurler and Gaelic footballer
Dominique McElligott (born 1986), Irish actress
John J. McElligott (1882–1946), American Fire Commissioner
John L. McElligott (born 1958), Irish Gaelic footballer
Ken McElligott (born 1940), Australian politician
Sarah Isabella McElligott (1883–1986), New Zealand cook